The hexasyllable or hexasyllabic verse is a line of verse with six syllables.

The orphan hexasyllable is a metric specificity of certain French epic poems. This kind of verse in the Garin de Monglane's Song in a 14th-century manuscript turns out original in an epic production.

Hexasyllable is sometimes used in French, Italian, Spanish and Portuguese poetry.

See also 
 octosyllable
 decasyllable
 hendecasyllable
 dodecasyllable

References
 Diccionario de la lengua española © 2005 Espasa-Calpe

Types of verses